Franz Schmidt may refer to:
 Franz Schmidt (composer)
 Franz Schmidt (executioner)
 Franz Schmidt (footballer)
 Franz Schmidt (serial killer)

See also
 Franz Schmitt, German Olympic wrestler